Mycotretus is a genus of pleasing fungus beetles in the family Erotylidae. There is one described species in Mycotretus, M. nigromanicatus.

References

Further reading

 
 

Erotylidae
Articles created by Qbugbot